SM6, Sm6, sM6 or sm6 stands for:
 KT Class Sm6, a type of train owned by Karelian Trains and operated by the Russian Railways and VR Group
 RIM-174 Standard ERAM, a surface-to-air naval missile
 SM6 postcode area, the Sutton postcode area covering Wallington, Beddington, Hackbridge, Roundshaw and South Beddington
 Renault Talisman`s Korean name
 Titleist Golf club.